FTH may refer to:

 Fathom, a unit of length
 Full Time Hobby, a British record label
 Future Transport Helicopter, a proposed transport helicopter